Gregory Lee Walker (born October 6, 1959) is an American former professional baseball first baseman. He played in Major League Baseball (MLB) from 1982 to 1990. He is the former hitting coach of the Chicago White Sox, the team for which he played all but the last 14 games of his career, until leaving the White Sox to become the hitting coach for the Atlanta Braves, a position he held from 2012 until 2014.

Career

Playing career
Walker was drafted by the Philadelphia Phillies in the 20th round (511th overall) of the 1977 Major League Baseball draft. He was selected by the White Sox in the Rule 5 draft in 1979. He was called up to the major leagues in 1982 and spent almost his entire MLB playing career with the White Sox. In 1988, Walker had a seizure on the field at Comiskey Park during fielding practice. He was released by Chicago early in the 1990 season and subsequently signed with the Baltimore Orioles. Baltimore released him shortly thereafter.

Over his career, Walker hit 113 home runs and drove in 444 runs while scoring 368 times in 855 career games.

Coaching career
When he began his coaching career, he did so with the White Sox Triple-A club in Charlotte. In 2003, he joined the parent club as hitting coach.

After nine seasons serving as the hitting coach of the Chicago White Sox, including their victory in the 2005 World Series, it was announced on October 21, 2011, that Walker was hired by the Atlanta Braves to serve as their hitting coach for the 2012 season. Walker filled the role vacated by the firing of Larry Parrish. Walker resigned in September 2014, as the team compiled a .241 batting average, 573 runs, 123 home runs, and 1,369 strikeouts, struggling mightily in the final month of the season. He returned to the Braves as a special assistant of baseball operations in February 2015.

Personal
Walker is a cousin of Harry Spilman, a former MLB player.

References

External links

1959 births
Living people
American expatriate baseball players in Canada
Appleton Foxes players
Atlanta Braves coaches
Atlanta Braves scouts
Auburn Phillies players
Baltimore Orioles players
Baseball coaches from Georgia (U.S. state)
Baseball players from Georgia (U.S. state)
Chicago White Sox coaches
Chicago White Sox players
Edmonton Trappers players
Glens Falls White Sox players
Major League Baseball first basemen
Major League Baseball hitting coaches
People from Douglas, Georgia
Peninsula Pilots players
Rochester Red Wings players
Spartanburg Phillies players